Moorabbin Football Club, nicknamed the Kangaroos, was the name of two distinct Australian rules football clubs which played in the Victorian Football Association (VFA). The first club, founded in the early 20th century, joined the VFA in 1951 and played there until 1963 with great success; they played home matches at Moorabbin Oval and wore royal blue and white hooped jerseys. The second club played in the VFA from 1983 to 1987.

History

Original Moorabbin Football Club (1909 –1964)

Moorabbin played initially in the Federal Football League, making their debut in 1909 and competing until 1950. The club wore a black and white jumper like . During this time the club won 12 premierships, including winning all six premierships staged over the nine years between 1940 and 1948 (the competition was in recess from 1942 until 1944).

The club entered the VFA in 1951. A clash of jumpers with Brunswick the team had to change and they choose the blue and white like . Its Federal League home ground, the Dane Road Reserve, was not up to VFA standards; so, in 1951 the club played at Cheltenham, and in 1952 moved into the Moorabbin Oval, which the Moorabbin Council had developed during 1951. The Kangaroos made the 1954 and 1955 finals series without success but in 1957 they helped eliminate premiership favourite Williamstown after defeating them by two points in the Semi Final. Moorabbin, who were coached by Bill Faul, took on Port Melbourne in the Grand Final, whom they had not once beaten since joining the league. In another upset, Moorabbin won comfortably to claim their maiden VFA premiership.

In 1958, Moorabbin reached the Grand Final once more, but were forced to return the following weekend after drawing with Williamstown. The replay was won by Williamstown, the first and only instance of a grand final replay in the VFA.

By the 1960s, the club was one of the strongest both on and off the field in the VFA. Its 1962 match payments to players of £12 for a win and £6 for a loss were the highest in Association history. The club was minor premier in three consecutive years from 1961 until 1963, and reached the 1962 and 1963 Grand Finals. It lost in remarkable fashion to Sandringham in 1962 – despite trailing by 44 points at three quarter time, Sandringham put on an eight goal final quarter to win by a single point. Moorabbin exacted its revenge the following year, beating Sandringham twice in the finals in 1963, including a 64-point win in the Grand Final under coach, Graham Dunscombe, who was appointed mid-season.

In the early 1960s, the Moorabbin Council was very keen to bring a Victorian Football League team to Moorabbin Oval. The council was the main driving force, but the extent to which the club supported the council in its ambitions put the club in dispute with the VFA over its loyalty. The club originally intended to seek readmission for the 1965 season, but in July the club committee decided to withdraw permanently from the Association, and disbanded.

Honours
VFA Premierships (2)
 1957, 1963
J. J. Liston Trophy winners (1)
 Les Moroney (1955)
Federal Football League (12)
1914, 1926, 1927, 1930, 1931, 1933, 1940, 1941, 1945, 1946, 1947, 1948.

1979-1987 Moorabbin Mark II
In 1979, the neighbouring McKinnon and Bentleigh Football Clubs in the Federal League merged, with the amalgamated club based at McKinnon but known as Moorabbin, taking the same colours and nickname as the former Moorabbin. The merged club competed in the Federal League until 1981, after which the league folded, and then played in the South East Suburban Football League in 1982. The club was admitted to the expanded VFA second division in 1983. The club competed for just over four years in Division 2, its best performance coming in 1985 when it recruited champion goalkicker Fred Cook and missed the finals on percentage.

After playing the first two matches of the 1987 season, the club forfeited two successive games after coach Graham Stewart resigned over a dispute with the board, and a large group of players walked out in support; the club was suspended by the VFA for its inability to field a team in all three grades, and then went into recess and ultimately folded.

Current team
The Moorabbin name is now used by the Moorabbin Kangaroos Football Club in the Southern Football League. The club was originally known as Moorabbin West Football Club, taking on the new name from 2003.

References

External links

 Full Points Footy: Moorabbin

Moorabbin Football Club
Australian rules football clubs in Melbourne
1909 establishments in Australia
Australian rules football clubs established in 1909
1964 disestablishments in Australia
Australian rules football clubs disestablished in 1964
1979 establishments in Australia
Australian rules football clubs established in 1979
1987 disestablishments in Australia
Australian rules football clubs disestablished in 1987